ArentFox Schiff LLP is a white shoe law firm and lobbying firm based in Washington, D.C. with offices in New York City, Boston, San Francisco, Los Angeles, Ann Arbor, and Lake Forest. It represents corporations, politicians, and nonprofit organizations. The firm is ranked 81st on the Vault.com Law 100 list of most prestigious law firms in the United States.

In addition to its lobbying practice, it has practices in antitrust, corporate, environmental, intellectual property, litigation, real estate, tax law, bankruptcy, international trade, corporate finance, and ERISA matters.  The firm also has special practice groups for certain industries, such as metaverse law, the automotive industry, construction, healthcare, hospitality, energy, non-profit organizations, media and entertainment, sweepstakes and loyalty programs, and life sciences.

History
In 1944, Albert E. Arent joined the law practice of Henry J. Fox, and together they founded Arent Fox. Other founders Edwin L. Kahn, Harry M. Plotkin and Earl W. Kintner were added and the firm was called Arent, Fox, Kintner, Plotkin & Kahn.

In 2022, it merged with Schiff Hardin.

Notable lawyers and alumni
 David J. Bardin, former Deputy Administrator of the Federal Energy Administration
 Carol A. Beier, Associate Justice of the Kansas Supreme Court, practiced white-collar criminal defense at the firm during the 1980s.
 Bob Bennett, former United States Senator from Utah.
Randall Boe was an associate at Arent Fox before becoming general counsel to America Online.
 Dale Bumpers, former Governor of Arkansas and U.S. Senator for Arkansas, worked in the firm's Washington, D.C. office prior to his death on January 1, 2016.
 John Culver, former U.S. Senator for Iowa, worked in the firm's Washington, D.C. office prior to his death on December 27, 2018.
Phil English, Former Member of the U.S. House of Representatives from Pennsylvania's 3rd congressional district.
 Lorie Skjerven Gildea, Chief Justice of the Minnesota Supreme Court, was an associate at Arent Fox before returning to Minnesota and beginning her career as a prosecutor.
 Byron Dorgan, former United States Senator from North Dakota.
Doug Jones, former United States Senator from Alabama.
Robert C. O'Brien, former 28th United States National Security Advisor, former US delegate to the 60th session of the United Nations General Assembly, joined the firm's Los Angeles office in 2007. 
Deborah K. Owen, former member of the Federal Trade Commission (FTC), joined the firm in 1994 
Pierre-Richard Prosper, former United States Ambassador-at-Large for War Crimes Issues, joined the firm's Los Angeles office in 2007.
 Jim Talent, former U.S. Senator from Missouri, served as a lobbyist at Arent Fox in 2001.
 Fred Thompson, former U.S. Senator for Tennessee, actor, and 2008 presidential candidate has served as a lobbyist for Arent Fox.
 Chris Van Hollen, U.S. Senator from Maryland, former member of the U.S. House of Representatives from Maryland's 8th district

References

External links
 
 
1942 establishments in Washington, D.C.
Law firms based in Washington, D.C.
Law firms established in 1942
Lobbying firms